Fasil Kenema Sport Club (Amharic: ፋሲል ከነማ ስፖርት ክለብ), also known as Fasil City, is a professional Ethiopian football club based in Gondar, Amhara Region. They play in the Ethiopian Premier League, the top division of football in Ethiopia.

History

Beginnings 
Fasil Kenema is one of the oldest organized sport teams in Ethiopia. Established in 1968 (1960 E.C.) in the historic city of Gondar, Fasil Kenema served as the first and only sport club for many years. The club is named after the 17th century Ethiopian Emperor Fasilides who ruled Ethiopia from its then capital city Gondar.

Promotion and relegation (2006-2016) 
Having played for many years in the second division of Ethiopian football, the Ethiopian Higher League, the club earned its first promotion to the Premier League after the 2006-07 season (2000 E.C.).In their inaugural campaign during the 2007-08 season, Fasil Kenema struggled to keep pace with most of the clubs. The club's stay in the top tier of Ethiopian football would be shortlived as the club was relegated back to the Higher League after their inaugural 2007-08 season.

Return to the Premier League (2016-present) 
It would take the club a further 8 years to reach the Premier League again by virtue of becoming champions of the 2015-16 (2008 E.C.) Ethiopian Higher League. Fasil Kenema was able to place in 6th place in the 2016-2017 Premier League Season securing their stay in the top tier.

Fasil Kenema were involved in one of the more infamous plays of the 2017-18 Season, when during a game against Welwalo Adigrat  they became the beneficiaries of an bizarre own goal by the Welwalo Adigrat goalkeeper. The goal was crucial as it turned out to be the winner, handing Fasil Kenema all 3 points. Fasil was Ethiopia's representative in the 2019-20 and 2020-21 CAF Confederation Cup by virtue of the club capturing the 2019 Ethiopian Cup. The club lifted its first league title after the 2020-21 season.

Stadium 
Fasil Kenema plays their home matches at Fasiledes Stadium in Gondar, Ethiopia. Named after the cities founder, Emperor Fasiledes, it has served the club since its creation in 1960 E.C. In 2010, the stadium underwent minor renovations funded by the local municipality and private donors. There are plans to build a new stadium in a different location in Gondar in the hopes it will host the club in the future.

Support 
Fesil Kenema enjoys large support from residents of its home city and region of Gondar, with many fans traveling with the team during away matches. The supporter are known for creating a festive atmosphere, especially at home matches with their relentless display of song and dance. The team is nicknamed "The Emperors" (አፄዎቹ) by its fans in reference to the great 17th century Ethiopian Emperor Fasilides.

Honors

Domestic 
Ethiopian Premier League: 1
2021.

 Ethiopian Cup: 1
2019.

Ethiopian Super Cup: 1
2019.

African 

 CAF Confederation Cup: 2 appearances
2020 – Preliminary Round

2021 – Preliminary Round

Players

First-team squad
As of 6 January 2021

Club officials

Coaching staff 

Manager/Head coach:  Hailu Negash

First Assistant coach:   

Assistant coach:  Muluken Abuhi 

Goalkeeper coach:  Adam Bazezew 

Team Doctor:  Shemles Desalegn

Former Managers 
  Mentesenot Getu
 Seyoum Abate 
 Webetu Abate

References

Football clubs in Ethiopia
Sport in Amhara Region
Gondar